Tom Götze (born 1968, Dresden) is a German bassist and professor at the Hochschule für Musik Carl Maria von Weber in Dresden for double bass and electric bass jazz/rock/pop.

Life 
Götze's musical career began in Dresden. From 1984 to 1990, he studied  tuba, bass guitar and double bass at the Hochschule für Musik Carl Maria von Weber Dresden. Since 1993, he has been active as a musician in the styles of jazz, rock, pop and classical as well as an actor (among others Staatsschauspiel Dresden).

Since 1989 Götze has been a member of the Dresden band Dekadance, with whom several albums have been produced.

Professor 
Since 2012, he has taught been double bass and bass guitar at his own alma mater, the Hochschule für Musik Carl Maria von Weber Dresden.

Recordings 
 2019: The 10string Orchestra Clouds
 2013: Stephan Bormann, Tom Götze, The Ten String Orchestra: Pearls (Acoustic Music)
 2013: Lars Kutschke Right Here, Right Now
 2012: Tom Goetze Band Bass Shuttle

Awards 
 2015 – Golden German Jazz Award for the Album Auserwählt by Manfred Krug and Uschi Brüning
 2016 – Platin German Jazz Award for the Album Auserwählt.
 2017 – Golden German Jazz Award für das Album Manfred Krug – Seine Lieder

References

External links 
 
 
 

German jazz double-bassists
1960s births
Living people
Musicians from Dresden
Date of birth missing (living people)